Dalopius is a genus of beetles belonging to the family Elateridae.

The species of this genus are found in Europe, Japan and Northern America.

Species 

 Dalopius agnellus W.J.Brown, 1934
 Dalopius asellus W.J.Brown, 1934
 Dalopius bizen Kishii, 1984
 Dalopius brevicornis W.J.Brown, 1934
 Dalopius cognatus W.J.Brown, 1934
 Dalopius corvinus W.J.Brown, 1934
 Dalopius fucatus W.J.Brown, 1934
 Dalopius fuscipes W.J.Brown, 1934
 Dalopius gartrelli W.J.Brown, 1934
 Dalopius gentilis W.J.Brown, 1934
 Dalopius gracilis W.J.Brown, 1934
 Dalopius ignobilis W.J.Brown, 1934
 Dalopius inordinatus W.J.Brown, 1934
 Dalopius insolens W.J.Brown, 1934
 Dalopius insolitus W.J.Brown, 1934
 Dalopius insulanus W.J.Brown, 1934
 Dalopius marginatus (Linnaeus, 1758)
 Dalopius maritimus W.J.Brown, 1934
 Dalopius mirabilis W.J.Brown, 1934
 Dalopius naomii (Kishii, 1981)
 Dalopius pallidus W.J.Brown, 1934
 Dalopius parvulus W.J.Brown, 1934
 Dalopius patagiatus (Lewis, 1894)
 Dalopius pennsylvanicus W.J.Brown, 1934
 Dalopius sellatus Mannerheim, 1852
 Dalopius spretus W.J.Brown, 1934
 Dalopius suspectus W.J.Brown, 1934
 Dalopius tristis W.J.Brown, 1934
 Dalopius vagus W.J.Brown, 1934
 Dalopius vernus W.J.Brown, 1934

References

Elateridae
Elateridae genera